Evangelical Lutheran Church in France was a Lutheran denomination in France until its 2013 merger with the Reformed Church of France to form the United Protestant Church of France. It had 100,000 members at the time of the merger.

It covered all of France except for Alsace and Moselle. In those areas the Protestant Church of Augsburg Confession of Alsace and Lorraine is the governing Lutheran denomination.

References 

Lutheranism in France